The Sergeant is a series of nine pulp-novels written by Len Levinson under the pseudonym Gordon Davis. Len Levinson has over 60 novels to his credit, including two Western novels, Apache Dawn (1989) and Gold Town (1989), under the name of "Clay Dawson".

"The Sergeant" is Clarence Joseph "CJ" Mahoney, a fictional character created by the author. The series details his adventures and exploits as a U.S. GI, and former US Army Ranger, fighting in France during World War II.

The Series
The series consist of 9 books over a 3-year period beginning in 1980. Mahoney, we learn, has often been promoted and busted in his long career. During the period of the Novels, May 1944 to December 1944, Mahoney is a Master Sergeant, that serves in special missions with the Rangers, and as a Company Sergeant, Platoon Leader, and Squad Leader in the "Hammerhead" Division. Mahoney, with his always present side-kick, Corporal Edward Cranepool, become involved in several of the key battles for the liberation of France, and invasion of Germany. Mahoney, as a US Army Ranger aides the French Resistance before, during, and immediately after the June 6, 1944 D-Day invasions of France. Later, tired of always finding himself involved in "suicide" missions, Mahoney and Cranepool transfer to the "Hamerhead" Division in General George S Patton's 3rd Army. With the Hammerheads, Mahoney participates in the battles of the hedgerows after the Normandy invasions, the liberation of Paris, the crossing of the Moselle and battle for Metz, and the defense of Bastogne.

In the first book in the series, Death Train, which takes place in the summer of 1944, Mahoney is a US Army Ranger working behind German lines with the French Resistance, "maquis", to disrupt a rail-road line that will be essential to German troop and supply movement after the D-Day invasion on Omaha Beach. The book establishes Mahoney as a tough, career Army, individual, and an experienced combat veteran that had seen action since the initial US amphibious landings in 1942 at Morocco.

The series ends with Book 9, Hammerhead, circa late December 1944. Mahoney, disgusted by all the death he has seen, and killing he has done, is praying in a small Catholic church. Facing the altar, with his back to the church, he is nearly killed, before two of his arch enemies end up shooting each other. After determining that one of the men has died and the other likely did as well, Mahoney returns to his prayer. We do not learn any more of Mahoney, or Cranepool, after this.

There was several more months of European battle left to fight after December 1944. It is not known why the author, or publisher, discontinued the series.

List of Characters from The Sergeant Novel Series

Main Characters
 Clarence J. "CJ" Mahoney – The series' protagonist, veteran of combat in Africa, Sicily, Italy, and France. Fluent in several languages, including French and German, through a natural talent for learning by hearing, he was nicknamed "Perroquet" (parot) by the French Resistance. He was often promoted and busted in rank. During the course of the novels he is a Master Sergeant. Winner of the Distinguished Service Cross for actions at the Battle of Kasserine Pass, the Silver Star three times, and the Purple Heart (he was wounded multiple times in combat). Mahoney hailed from New York City, Manhattan, either from Yorkville (Death Train), or Hell's Kitchen (Doom River) both are cited as his "home-town" on several occasions. Mahoney trained at Fort Dix, NJ, and Fort Benning, GA. He believed he would be killed-in-action before the end of the war, and often sought ways to avoid the hottest combat. In this he was almost never successful, finding himself not only in the thick of battle, but as an essential leader for US victory. He also had an insatiable sexual appetite, and counted many women in his sexual conquest including a mother / daughter pair, and a movie star in France with the USO.
Edward Cranepool – A corporal in the US Army Rangers, and later Hammerhead infantry division, Cranepool is Mahoney's fiercely loyal side-kick. He aspires to be promoted and even attend Officer's Candidate School, believing that as an enlisted man he would make a popular officer with his men. He is much younger than Mahoney (whose age is never given), being about 20 years old during the time period covered by the novels. He has fought side by side with Mahoney at least since the Italian campaign, and treats Mahoney like a father figure. Cranepool enjoys combat, and killing, and is always next to Mahoney is the thickest part of the battle; however he is very rarely hurt or wounded. He starts out as a rather innocent Iowa farm boy, inexperienced sexually, and without the vices of gambling and drinking (which Mahoney partakes of often). As the series progresses, so does Cranpool's worldly knowledge. Mahoney begins to believe that Cranepool's innocence kept him safe, and that as he engages more and more into sin he will be wounded and maybe killed.

The Rangers
The 23rd Rangers, to which Mahoney and Cranepool belonged in the first two novels.

"Bulldog" Boyton – Mahoney and Cranpool's C.O. in the 23rd Rangers. KIA - June, 1944.

The Hammerheads
The 33rd Infantry Division of the Third Army. Known as the "Hammerheads" for their tough fighting style, they were one of Patton's favorites. The Hammerhead's landed on Utah Beach, D-Day plus 1 (Bloody Bush). The Hammerheads were often fight in the heaviest combat zones of the front, and often took substantial casualties. Mahoney and Cranepool joined the Hammerheads in Book 3, believing an infantry division would be safer than the combat they had seen as Rangers.

Captain Anderson – Commanding Officer, Charlie Company, 15th Regiment, Hammerhead Division, Third Army. Promoted from Lieutenant to Captain during the battle of the hedgerows (Bloody Bush), with a little help from Mahoney. He was a recent West Point graduate just before the D-Day invasion and unfamiliar with actual combat. KIA - December, 1944

The Maquis and other Resistance Fighters
Captain Montegnac – Thirty-five-year-old (in 1944) with a black Charles de Gaulle mustache. Member of the Free French Army, and French resistance fighter.

The Germans

Colonel Richter – First seen as a Major in the Gestapo, in Death Train, Richter was ultimately promoted to Colonel in charge of an SS combat division. He encounters Mahoney on 3 occasions throughout the series. In their first meeting Mahoney badly beats Richter up, breaking his nose and cheek bones, disfiguring his once handsome face. After that meeting, Richter recognizes Mahoney, who never seems to recognize Richter, and makes several attempts to kill him out of revenge. However, on each occasion Mahoney further beats up Richter, until Richter is presumably killed by GI Lt. Woodward in a small church. Woodward himself had been about to kill Mahoney, for humiliating him in combat for his lack of prowess, when he saw an SS Officer (Richter) moving in his peripheral vision and shot him instinctively (Woodward also died from a gunshot inflicted by Richter, Hammerhead). Richter had crawled away to an underground passage under the monastery where the battle occurred, but it was felt that he probably didn't survive.

Non-Combatants
Laura Hubbard – Film actress under contract with MGM studios. Sam Goldwyn once gave her a gift of a gold cigarette lighter for signing with them. Traveled through France entertaining GIs at USO shows with Bob Hope. 26 years old in 1944, she earned half a million dollars a year. She was extremely beautiful and popular. She once had a one night stand with Mahoney (who had stolen into her room for sex on a bet), about which she made him swear he would never reveal, under any circumstances (a promise he kept even to the detriment of his own reputation) (Doom River).

Historical
General George S. Patton Jr. – Mahoney met General Patton on several occasions. Patton's impression was always positive, believing Mahoney to be an iconic example of the tough, resourceful American Fighting Soldier.
General Dwight D. Eisenhower
Field Marshal Erwin Rommel
Field Marshal Bernard Montgomery
General Anthony McAuliffe

The Books
(all by Gordon Davis)
The novels were all published Kensington Publishing, Corp., in the United States. The first three were printed by the Zebra Books division. They used a uniform cover design featuring a large color, portrait drawing of a US GI (Mahoney), and a small combat action scene in the lower right. Starting with the fourth book in the series, the novels were printed by the Bantam Books division, and the title graphics changed, though the artwork remained relatively unchanged.

Death Train 1980, Zebra Books, Kensington Publishing, Corp.
Hell Harbor: The Battle for Cherbourg 1980, Zebra Books, Kensington Publishing, Corp.
Bloody Bush 1980, Zebra Books, Kensington Publishing, Corp.
The Liberation of Paris 1981, Bantam Books, Kensington Publishing, Corp.
Doom River 1981, Bantam Books, Kensington Publishing, Corp.
Slaughter City 1981, Bantam Books, Kensington Publishing, Corp.
Bullet Bridge 1981, Bantam Books, Kensington Publishing, Corp.
Bloody Bastogne 1981, Bantam Books, Kensington Publishing, Corp.
Hammerhead 1982, Bantam Books, Kensington Publishing, Corp.

Notes

External links
 - Follow the action-crammed exploits of Sgt. CJ Mahoney, the big, brawling career GI as he battles the Nazis from D-Day to the Battle of the Bulge. Site has all book cover graphics.
  - The Sergeant Series at Alibris Books
 The Sergeant Series on Amazon.com

Fictional soldiers
Pulp fiction
Novels first published in serial form
Works published under a pseudonym